Humayun Azad (born Humayun Kabir; 28 April 1947 – 12 August 2004) was a Bangladeshi poet, novelist, short-story writer, critic, linguist, columnist and professor of Dhaka University. He wrote more than sixty titles. He was awarded the Bangla Academy Literary Award in 1986 for his contributions to Bengali linguistics. In 2012, the Government of Bangladesh honored him with Ekushey Padak posthumously for his contributions to Bengali literature.

Early life and education
Azad was born as Humayun Kabir on 28 April 1947 in Rarhikhal village in Bikrampur which village is now under the Sreenagar sub-district of Munshiganj district. Notable scientist Jagadish Chandra Bose was born in the same village. He passed the secondary examination from Sir Jagadish Chandra Basu Institute in 1962 and higher secondary examination from Dhaka College in 1964. He earned BA and MA degrees in Bengali language and literature from the University of Dhaka in 1967 and 1968 respectively. He obtained his PhD in linguistics submitting his thesis titled "Pronominalisation in Bangla" from the University of Edinburgh in 1976. Azad changed his surname from Kabir to Azad on 28 September 1988 by the magistrate of Narayanganj District.

Career
Azad started his career in 1969 by joining the Chittagong College. He joined the University of Chittagong as a lecturer on 11 February 1970 and Jahangirnagar University in 1972. He was appointed as an associate professor of Bengali at the University of Dhaka on 1 November 1978 and got promoted to the post of professor in 1986.

Literary works

Azad's first published book was about collection of poems written by himself (written from 1960s decade to 1972), the book was titled as Alaukik Istimar, this was published in 1973, in which year he went to Scotland for studying Ph.D in Linguistics from University of Edinburgh. He wrote a short-story in 1979 called Onoboroto Tusharpat which was inspired from his newly-wed life with his Dhaka University class-mate Latifa Kohinoor, he took Latifa Scotland after the marriage in 1975, in Britain one day among heavy snowing Azad was driving a car with his wife which became the main plot of the short story; so many years later Azad included this short-story in his 1996 book Jadukorer Mrityu which book is the collection of his own-written five short-stories.

Towards the end of the 1980s, he started to write newspaper column focusing on contemporary sociopolitical issues. His commentaries continued throughout the 1990s and were later published as books as they grew in numbers. Through his writings of the 1990s and early 2000s he established himself as a novelist.

In 1992 Azad published the first comprehensive feminist book in Bengali titled Naree. Naree received both positive and negative reviews as a treatise, it was considered the first full-fledged feminist book after the independence of Bangladesh. In this work Azad mentioned the pro-women contributions of the British India's two famous Bengali socio-political reformers: Raja Rammohan Roy and Ishwar Chandra Vidyasagar, he criticized Rabindranath Tagore, a famous Bengali poet and Nobel laureate, and Bankim Chandra Chatterjee, a famous Bengali novelist of the 19th century. The work, critical of the patriarchal and male-chauvinistic attitude of society towards women, attracted negative reactions from many Bangladeshi readers. The Government of Bangladesh banned the book in 1995. The ban was eventually lifted in 2000, following a legal battle that Azad won in the High Court of the country.

In the year of 1994 he published his first novel which was titled as Chhappanno Hajar Borgomail; the novel was about military rule in Bangladesh in 1980s decade. He got special recognition for his second novel Sab Kichu Bhene Pare (1995) which was based on interpersonal relationship of Bangladeshi society. He wrote Ekti Khuner Svapna, an unrequited love-based novel where the main male protagonist lives in Salimullah Muslim Hall of Dhaka University where Azad lived during his student life, it was Azad's last novel published in 2004 in which year he died. Other important novels are Kobi Othoba Dondito Aupurush and Nijer Shonge Nijer Jiboner Modhu, the first was based on a fictitious late 20th century Bangladeshi male poet's life who is castrated after involving in live-in relationship with a much younger woman and the latter was inspired by Humayun Azad's own rural life when he was a teen-aged boy. Another noted novel written by Azad was Fali Fali Kore Kata Chand, where the main female protagonist character Shirin is an educated young woman with self-boastfulness, she engages in adultery, leaves her husband and becomes misandrist.

Azad also wrote teen-age literature, among them, the discourse-book Laal Neel Deepabali is noted, this book was written for teen-aged boys and girls as Azad's aim was to teach Bangladeshi adolescent boys and girls about the history of Bengali literature in short.

Assassination attempt
On 27 February 2004, near the campus of the University of Dhaka during the annual Bangla Academy book fair, two assailants, armed with chopper machetes, hacked Azad several times on the jaw, lower part of the neck and hands. Azad was taken to the nearby Dhaka Medical College and Hospital. By the order of the then Prime Minister of Bangladesh Khaleda Zia, Azad was immediately sent to the Combined Military Hospital (CMH), Dhaka for better treatment and later to Bumrungrad International Hospital in Thailand where he recovered.

Azad had been fearing for his life ever since excerpts of his novel, Pak Sar Jamin Sad Bad were first published in The Daily Ittefaq Newspapers Eid supplement in 2003. In that novel, he indecorously criticised the political ideologies of the Islamic extremists of Bangladesh. After that book had been published, he started receiving various threats from the Islamist fundamentalists.

A week prior to Azad's assault, Delwar Hossain Sayeedi, one of the members of parliament of Bangladesh said in the parliament, that Azad's political satire Pak Sar Jamin Sad Bad must be banned; he also wanted infliction of the blasphemy law of Bangladesh for this kind of book. In 2006, one of the leaders of the fundamentalist organization Jama'atul Mujahideen Bangladesh (JMB) admitted to the RAB interrogators that his operatives carried out the attack on writer Azad, as well as two other murders, bomb blasts, and 2002 attacks on cinemas.

Death

On 12 August 2004, Azad was found dead in his apartment in Munich, Germany, where he had arrived a week earlier to conduct research on the nineteenth century German romantic poet Heinrich Heine, several months after the Islamists' machete attack on him at a book fair, which had left him grievously injured. His family demanded an investigation, alleging that the extremists who had attempted the earlier assassination had a role in this death. While alive, Azad had expressed his wish to donate his body to medical college after his death. But he was buried in Rarhikhal, his village home in Bangladesh, as doctors denied to take his body for medical research, as several days had passed to reach his body to Bangladesh from Germany. The first death anniversary of Azad was observed with respect in Rarhikhal village on Friday, the 12 August 2005.

Personal life
Azad married Latifa Kohinoor on 12 October 1975 whom he first met 1968 when studying M.A. in Dhaka University. Together they had two daughters, Smita and Mouli, and one son, Anannya.

Bibliography

Notable books
Alaukik Istimar, collection of poems (1973)
Pronominalization in Bengali (1983)
Naree, treatise on feminism (1992)
Chhappanno Hajar Borgomail, (1994), novel on martial law in Bangladesh
Sab Kichu Bhene Pare (1995)
Nijer Shonge Nijer Jiboner Modhu (2000)
Pak Sar Jamin Sad Bad (2004)

References

External links

 
1947 births
2004 deaths
Bengali writers
Bangladeshi male writers
Bengali poets
Bengali novelists
People from Bikrampur
Dhaka College alumni
University of Dhaka alumni
Alumni of the University of Edinburgh
Academic staff of the University of Chittagong
Academic staff of Jahangirnagar University
Academic staff of the University of Dhaka
Linguists from Bangladesh
Bengali-language writers
Bangladeshi male poets
Bangladeshi male novelists
Bangladeshi feminist writers
20th-century Bangladeshi poets
20th-century Bangladeshi writers
Recipients of the Ekushey Padak
Recipients of Bangla Academy Award
20th-century linguists